Callidiellum virescens is a species of beetle in the family Cerambycidae. It was described by Chemsak & Linsley in 1966.

References

Callidiini
Beetles described in 1966